Eurico de Freitas (21 May 1902 – 19 September 1991) was a Brazilian athlete. He competed in the men's pole vault at the 1924 Summer Olympics.

References

External links
 

1902 births
1991 deaths
Athletes (track and field) at the 1924 Summer Olympics
Brazilian male pole vaulters
Olympic athletes of Brazil
Place of birth missing